Close as You Get is sixteenth solo album by Northern Irish blues guitarist and singer Gary Moore. The album reunited Moore with his former Thin Lizzy colleague, drummer Brian Downey who played on all the tracks.

Track listing

Personnel
Gary Moore - vocals, guitar, dobro on "Sundown"
Brian Downey - drums
Vic Martin - keyboards
Pete Rees - bass
Mark Feltham - harmonica on "Hard Times" and "Checkin' Up on My Baby"
Produced by Gary Moore and Ian Taylor
Engineered and mixed by Ian Taylor, assisted by Jonathan Tayler-Webb.
Recorded and mixed at Sarm Hookend, except "I Had a Dream" backing track, recorded at Sphere Studios by Franco Cameli, assisted by Joshua Blair.

References

2007 albums
Eagle Records albums
Gary Moore albums